Romsa may refer to:

 Tromsø, city, Romsa in Northern Sami
Troms, county, Romsa in Northern Sami